Daniel House (born August 8, 1961) is an American business owner and he was president and owner of C/Z Records, a Seattle-based independent record label that released music by many bands including 7 Year Bitch, Built to Spill, Coffin Break, Engine Kid, The Gits, Hammerbox, Love Battery, The Melvins, The Presidents of the United States of America, Silkworm, and Skin Yard. In 2003 he moved from Seattle to Los Angeles where he oversaw the development and creation of the now-defunct www.DownloadPunk.com as well as the music-centric (now offline) online dating website, RocknRollDating.com.

Musical career 
House’s first band was the little-known Seattle band Death of Marat, named after a painting by Jacques-Louis David depicting the assassination of radical journalist Jean-Paul Marat during the French Revolution. The band lasted for a little over a year, starting in 1982 and breaking up in late 1983.

In 1984 House formed an instrumental prog-rock three-piece band called feeDBack with Matt Cameron on drums and a guitarist named "Nerm" (real name Tom Herring). feeDBack lasted only 10 months but managed to record 9 songs on a 4-track recorder that Cameron owned. The songs have subsequently been remixed and mastered by Jack Endino, and released in 2012 in MP3 format.

Shortly after forming feeDBack, House was recruited to play bass in 10 Minute Warning (TMW), replacing the recently departed David Garrigues. TMW was unique at the time in that they originated as a punk band, but had evolved into something slower, heavier and with psychedelic overtones. TMW are popularly regarded as one of the first progenitors of the grunge movement. 10 Minute Warning broke up at the end of 1984 after guitarist Paul Solger quit, and drummer Greg Gilmore left Seattle to join former 10 Minute Warning guitarist Duff McKagan in Los Angeles.

Skin Yard 
On June 7, 1985 Skin Yard played their first show opening for the U-Men. Skin Yard’s music was first released on the Deep Six compilation album which also featured tracks by Soundgarden, The Melvins, U-Men, Green River and Malfunkshun.

Later career 
In 1988 House co-wrote and recorded The Last Laugh, Helios Creed’s first for Amphetamine Reptile Records with Jason Finn on drums.

In 1989, House was the drummer for Seattle band, Yeast, who released one 7" single ("Crisco Wristwatch") and a track on Teriyaki Asthma Vol. I which also included tracks from Nirvana, Helios Creed and Coffin Break. The other members of Yeast were Milton Garrison from Vexed and Al Thompkins from Daddy Hate Box. Yeast highlights included sharing the bill once with Soundgarden and once with Tad.

In 1993 House played one show with the band Pretty Mary Sunshine (opening for Red House Painters) while bass player Joe Skyward was in Europe playing with The Posies. Pretty Mary Sunshine asked House to become their permanent bass-player, but he declined. That was the last time House performed on stage.

As record label owner 
Daniel House purchased the rights and ownership of fledgling Seattle-based label C/Z Records from Chris Hanzsek in 1986. Initially House intended the label as a vehicle to release music by Skin Yard, his band at the time. Skin Yard’s only previously released material was on C/Z’s Deep Six compilation, and House wanted to maintain the ongoing sales efforts for the remaining LPs still in stock.

House continued to release records by other bands in the Seattle area, while working at a series of jobs, eventually working as Director of Sales and Distribution for Sub Pop Records in 1988. House left Sub Pop in 1991 in an effort to make C/Z a viable business. Over the next several years C/Z grew into an independent label.

At its peak, C/Z employed 13 people and was a full-service label with distribution in North America, Europe and Australia. In 1993, C/Z entered into a production and distribution deal with Sony-owned RED Distribution. By 1994, that deal had drained C/Z of all its financial resources and effectively shut C/Z down, leaving House deep in debt. In 1996 the BMG-owned Zoo Entertainment partnered with C/Z for a third-party venture deal which helped to resolve the debt incurred during the RED Distribution deal. Zoo provided a modest operating and recording budget and assisted in the development of new artists.

That same year, House appeared in the 1996 grunge documentary Hype!, the footage of which had been shot in 1992-1993.

In 1997 Zoo was purchased and all third party ventures were dropped. C/Z would then be turned back to a part-time venture with House looking towards new opportunities that would still keep him involved in music. The shift would move him towards Internet-based music and entertainment ventures. In 1998, House began working in the music department at streaming media pioneer RealNetworks as an editor for their online content portal, the RealGuide.

Personal life 
In 2003, House moved to Los Angeles.

References

External links 
 Daniel House Official Site
 C/Z Records Official Site
 RocknRollDating.com

Living people
American rock bass guitarists
Grunge musicians
1961 births
Guitarists from Washington (state)
American male bass guitarists
20th-century American bass guitarists
Skin Yard members
20th-century American male musicians